DAV School is a Central Board of Secondary Education-affiliated school in Adambakkam, Chennai, India. The school's motto is "Asato Maa Sadgamaya".

The school is located in Nilamangai Nagar, Adambakkam. It has branches in Meenambakkam and Kancheepuram. It has a college granting Bachelor of Education degrees at Santhavellore village near Sunguvarchattiram in Kancheepuram.

The school's secretary is Dr.S. Varadarajan and its higher secondary principal is V. Rajendran. His wife, V. Geetha, is the principal for lower classes and T.K. Santhama is the educational director of the school.

References

 The Indian Education Daily

Schools in Chennai
Schools affiliated with the Arya Samaj
Educational institutions established in 1985
1985 establishments in Tamil Nadu